The PC-461-class submarine chasers were a class of 343 submarine chasers constructed mainly for the US Navy and built from 1941 to 1944. The PC-461s were based primarily on two experimental submarine chasers, PC-451 and PC-452. While PC-461 began the series, the first of the class to enter service was PC-471. As part of the Lend-Lease program, 46 ships of this class were transferred to allies of the United States. Fifty-nine PC-461s were converted to other types of patrol vessels. Only one of the class, USS PC-566 commanded by Lieutenant Commander (later Captain) Herbert G. Claudius, actually sank a submarine, during World War II; however, the website 'Patrol Craft Sailors Association' cites PC-461-class ships sinking or assisting sinking up to 6 German and Japanese subs.

PC-461 submarine chasers were used in the Pacific, Atlantic, Caribbean, and  Mediterranean. Numerous PC-461 class vessels were used to aid in amphibious assaults, including the Normandy invasion.

One member of this class, was one of only two ships in the US Navy during World War II that had a mostly African-American crew.

An unknown member of the class still survives as of June 17th, 2021 in the Columbia River just north of the Troutdale Airport.

Lend-Lease program
As part of the Lend-Lease program enacted by President Franklin D. Roosevelt, a total of 46 PC-461s were lent to allies of the United States. Thirty-two were sent to France, 10+ (3 to cannibalized for spare parts and 1 to private owner -George Simmonuti- as yacht in 1967) to Venezuela, 8 to Brazil, 1 to Uruguay, 1 to Norway, 1 to the Netherlands, and 1 to Greece.

Post-WWII importance
Following the end of World War II, many PC-461-class ships were placed into reserve squadrons or brought out of active service. Many more however were furnished to American allies around the world, most notably the Republic of Korea.

The first vessel to join the new ROK Navy was former , transferred to the Republic of Korea Navy and renamed  (PC-701). The vessel played a major part in the Battle of Korea Strait, the small naval battle fought on the first day of the Korean War in June 1950.

Six transferred to the Portuguese Navy in 1949 under the MDAP (Mutual Defense and Assistance Program) PC-812 as NRP Maio, PC-811 as NRP Madeira, PC-1257 as NRP Santiago, PC-809 as NRP Sal, PC-1256 as NRP São Tomé and PC-1259 as NRP São Vicente.

Five were transferred to the Indonesian Navy in 1958 and 1960 under the Mutual Assistance Program. PC-1141 as KRI Tjakalang, PC-1183 as KRI Tenggiri, PC-581 as KRI Torani, PC-580 as KRI Hiu, and PC-787 as KRI Alu-Alu.

Conversions
Twenty-four PC-461s were converted to patrol gunboats, motor (PGM) and 35 were converted into amphibious control craft (PCC). Eighteen were completed as s (AM) but their performance as such was judged to be unsatisfactory and they were converted back to the PC configuration.

Construction

 (all) (341)
  ...  (36)
  ...  (86)
  ...  (50)
  ...  (15)
  ...  (31)
  ...  (99)
  ...  (24)
  ...  (18) (see )

 Defoe Shipbuilding Company, MI (56)
  ... 
  ... 
  ... 
  ... 
 Consolidated Shipbuilding, NY (51)
  ... 
  ... 
  ... 
  ... 
  ... 
  ... 
  ... 
  ... 
 Commercial Iron Works, OR (43)
  ... 
  ... 
 For  ... , see 
 Leathem D. Smith Shipbuilding, WI (42)
  ... 
  ... 
  ... 
  ... 
  ... 
  ... 
 George Lawley & Son, MA (23)
  ... 
  ... 
  ... 
 Luders Marine Construction Company, CT (22)
  ... 
  ... 
  ... 
  ... 
 Albina Engine & Machine Works, OR (21)
  ... 
  ... 
  ... 
  ... 
 Dravo Corporation (20)
 Pittsburgh, Pennsylvania
  ... 
 
  ... 
  ... 
 Wilmington, Delaware
  ... 
 Sullivan Drydock and Repair Corporation, NY (16)
 , 
  ... 
  ... 
  ... 
 Gibbs Gas Engine Works, FL (14)
  ... 
  ... 
 Nashville Bridge Company, TN (14)
  ... 
  ... 
 ,  (see )
 Brown Shipbuilding, TX (12)
  ... 
  ... 
  ... 
 Jeffboat, IN (8)
  ... 
  ...

Engines

 2 x 1,440bhp Fairbanks Morse 38D8 1/8 diesel engines, Westinghouse reduction gear (63)
 461 ... 470, 483 ... 487, 563 ... 572, 578 ... 582, 600 ... 603, 616 ... 619
 1077 ... 1082, 1176 ... 1180, 1231 ... 1236, 1251 .. 1254, 1260 ... 1263
 (serial numbers listed in navsource.org reference)
 2 x 1,440bhp General Motors 16-258S diesel engines, Farrel-Birmingham single reduction gear (88)
 471 ... 482, 496, 542 ... 562, 583 ... 591, 596 ... 599, 604 ... 607, 620 ... 627
 1119 ... 1139, 1225 ... 1230, 1241, 1242
 serial numbers listed
 2 x 1,440bhp Hooven-Owen-Rentschler R-99DA diesel engines, Westinghouse single reduction gear (111)
 488 ... 495, 573 ... 577, 592 ... 595, 608 ... 615, 776 ... 789, 791 ... 795
 799 ... 804, 807, 810, 813 ... 822, 825, 1181 ... 1184, 1186, 1187, 1190 .. 1217
 1219 ... 1224, 1237 ... 1240, 1256 ... 1259, 1265
 1201, 1211, 1213, 1216 listed as having no reduction gear
 serial numbers in reference
 2 x 1,280bhp Hooven-Owen-Rentschler RB-99DA diesel engines, Westinghouse single reduction gear (18)
 790, 796 ... 798, 805, 806, 808, 809, 811, 812, 823, 824, 1185, 1188, 1189, 1218, 1255, 1264
 4 x 1,440bhp 6-cylinder ALCO 540 diesel engines, Westinghouse single reduction gear (3)
 1083 ... 1085
 obviously a mistake has been made there. Conway's All the worlds fighting ships even lists 1084 as a representative member and gives it only 2 engines
 2 x 1,440bhp General Motors 16-278A diesel engines, Farrel-Birmingham single reduction gear (57)
 1086 ... 1091, 1140 ... 1149, 1167 ... 1175, 1243 ... 1250, 1546 ... 1569
 listed as having Westinghouse gears: 1165

See also
 List of patrol vessels of the United States Navy
 List of Escorteurs of the French Navy

Citations

References
 Friedman, Norman (1987). US Small Combatants, Including PT-Boats, Subchasers, and the Brown-Water Navy: An Illustrated Design History

 
Submarine chaser classes
Ship classes of the French Navy